The Great Nor'easter (formerly called Fly - The Great Nor Easter from 2006 to 2016) is a steel inverted roller coaster, a Suspended Looping Coaster model manufactured by the Dutch company Vekoma. It is located at Morey's Piers amusement park in North Wildwood, New Jersey. The track is colored white and blue and seats 20 people per ride in two trains. Riders are required to give 10 tickets or have a wristband in order to ride, and must be over 52" and under 79". Further restrictions are posted at the ride, and loose articles (cell phones, flip flops, etc.) are not permitted.

The Great Nor'easter opened on May 26, 1995. It was known by that name until 2005, and since 2017.

Refurbishments

2006
For 2006, the track and supports were painted white. Previously, they had been painted in a pinkish-red.

2008
For 2008, the coaster received a 1.2 million dollar upgrade, which saw new-style "Freedom Seats" cars installed.
"The new train features an ergonomically designed seat making the ride experience more enjoyable by holding the rider firmly, while also providing unhindered vision in all directions as well as complete arm freedom. The design utilizes a lap bar and innovative vest, to comfortably restrain Guests during the ride. Add to that a redesigned station and all new red, white and blue color theme, and you have a brand new ride experience!” The seats were originally used for two Suspended Family Coaster, but people enjoyed them so much they added them to Suspended Looping Coasters.

2017
In February 2016, Morey's Piers revealed that $4 million would be spent on replacing 90% of the ride's track with new track that uses 'bending technology' to make for a smoother ride experience.

Incidents
Shortly after The Great Nor'easter opened, a 36-year-old worker was kicked in the temple by a passenger on a passing train and killed in August 1995.  Shortly after this incident, Morey's Piers employed a new restricted area system for all their major rides, preventing anyone from being within those areas while the ride is in motion.

References

External links 

 Fly – The Great Nor'easter's POV: https://www.youtube.com/watch?v=Zqca7VuWDZU
Morey's Piers homepage

Roller coasters in New Jersey
Roller coasters introduced in 1995
Morey's Piers